Sergei Yevgenyevich Volkov (born 9 September 2002) is a Russian football player who plays for FC Krasnodar.

Club career
He made his debut in the Russian Football National League for FC Krasnodar-2 on 10 July 2021 in a game against FC Spartak-2 Moscow.

He made his Russian Premier League debut for FC Krasnodar on 9 April 2022 against FC Rubin Kazan and scored a late winner in a 1–0 away victory.

Career statistics

References

External links
 
 
 

2002 births
People from Chita, Zabaykalsky Krai
Sportspeople from Zabaykalsky Krai
Living people
Russian footballers
Russia youth international footballers
Russia under-21 international footballers
Association football defenders
FC Krasnodar-2 players
FC Krasnodar players
Russian Second League players
Russian First League players
Russian Premier League players